Adi Vakaoca Bolakoro (born 3 April 1985) is a Fijian former netball player who played for Fiji in the positions of goal defense, wing defense or goal keeper. She was included in the Fijian squad for the 2019 Netball World Cup, which was also her maiden appearance at a Netball World Cup. She last played for the Celtic Dragons club in the Netball Superleague.

References 

1985 births
Living people
Fijian netball players
Netball Superleague players
2019 Netball World Cup players
Celtic Dragons players
Fijian expatriate sportspeople in Wales